The British Academy Television Craft Awards of 2005 are presented by the British Academy of Film and Television Arts (BAFTA) and were held on 8 May 2005 at The Dorchester, Mayfair, the ceremony was hosted by Jon Culshaw.

Winners and nominees
Winners will be listed first and highlighted in boldface.

Special awards
 Michael Hurll
 Michael Palin

See also
 2005 British Academy Television Awards

References

External links
British Academy Craft Awards official website

2005 television awards
2005 in British television
2005 in London
May 2005 events in the United Kingdom
2005